The 1906 Tour de France was the 4th edition of Tour de France, one of cycling's Grand Tours. The Tour began in Paris on 4 July and Stage 7 occurred on 16 July with a flat stage to Toulouse. The race finished in Paris on 29 July.

Stage 1
4 July 1906 — Paris to Lille,

Stage 2
11 July 1906 — Douai to Nancy,

Stage 3
14 July 1906 — Nancy to Dijon,

Stage 4
16 July 1906 — Dijon to Grenoble,

Stage 5
18 July 1906 — Grenoble to Nice,

Stage 6
20 July 1906 — Nice to Marseille,

Stage 7
20 July 1906 — Marseille to Toulouse,

References

1906 Tour de France
Tour de France stages